David Courtenay Harris was a High Court Judge on the Eastern Caribbean Supreme Court. A native of Dominica, he was assigned to reside in and hear cases from Antigua and Barbuda beginning in 2007. One of the cases he heard involved the Stanford International Bank of R. Allen Stanford. He is a graduate of the University of Windsor in Ontario.

References

Year of birth missing (living people)
Living people
Dominica lawyers
Dominica judges on the courts of Antigua and Barbuda
Dominica judges
University of Windsor alumni
Eastern Caribbean Supreme Court justices
University of Windsor Faculty of Law alumni
Dominica judges of international courts and tribunals